Joseph Tubb (1805–1879) was a maltster from Oxfordshire, England who created the Poem Tree at Wittenham Clumps, which died in the 1990s and finally collapsed in July 2012.

Biography 
Tubb lived at Lavender Cottage in Warborough, a village near the town of Dorchester. He wished to become a wood carver, but his father convinced him to become a maltster. He lived a country life as a bachelor.

Joseph Tubb opposed the enclosure of the commons and pulled down fences in rebellion against this. He spent a short time in the Oxford gaol.

Tubb's main legacy was to carve a poem on a large beech tree on the eastern side of Castle Hill at Wittenham Clumps. He took a tent and a ladder to Castle Hill and spent the summers of 1844 and 1845 carving the letters of a 20-line poem.
The poem demonstrates Joseph Tubb's passion for the Oxfordshire countryside. Discrepancies in wording between a written original and those on the tree are said to be because he carved from memory.

References 

1805 births
1879 deaths
People from Oxfordshire
English environmentalists
English prisoners and detainees
English male poets
19th-century English poets
19th-century English male writers